Bourgeonal is an aromatic aldehyde used in perfumery. It has a fragrance reminiscent of lily of the valley, otherwise described as floral, watery, green and aldehydic. It is a pale yellow liquid at room temperature.

It is toxic if swallowed and can cause skin irritation and sensitisation on contact.

In a 2003 study it was found that in vitro, bourgeonal acts as a chemo-attractant for human spermatozoa, activating an olfactory receptor called OR1D2 (formerly called hOR17-4) which opens calcium ion channels in the sperm, leading them to swim twice as fast.
Bourgeonal is suspected to be involved in helping sperm locate the ovum.

As of 2010, bourgeonal is the only known odor substance to which males have a higher average sensitivity than females. This is thought to be because the same olfactory receptor (OR1D2) is expressed in non-olfactory tissue in sperm cells as well as the olfactory tissue of the nose. The involvement with sperm chemotaxis causes an evolutionary pressure for males (sexual selection) that causes them to have more OR1D2 receptors on average, both in the nose as well as in sperm.

References

Perfume ingredients
Aldehydes
Tert-butyl compounds